Stevens Creek is a stream in Macon County, Illinois, United States.  A tributary of the Sangamon River, it originates in the northern part of the county, flowing southward through the village of Forsyth and city of Decatur before emptying into the Sangamon near the western boundaries of Decatur. For much of its path through the city, it is paralleled by a bike trail. Its principal tributary is Spring Creek, which joins it a few miles before Stevens joins the Sangamon. Its drainage area covers 87 square miles of Macon County.

Tributaries 

 Spring Creek
 Stevens Creek Tributary A
 Stevens Creek Tributary B

References 

Rivers of Macon County, Illinois
Rivers of Illinois